A chronology of the town of Falmouth was described by Miss Susan E. Gay in Old Falmouth (1903), pages 230–238.

Before the eighteenth century

9th century. Pendennis supposed to have been fortified by the Danes.
1120 The naming of Gyllyngvase.
1403 Manor of Arwenack acquired by the Killigrew family, temp. Richard II; Landing of the Duchess Dowager of Bretagne at Falmouth Haven, on her way to wed Henry IV.
1538 Old Fort erected on Pendennis Point; oldest (existing) fortification of Pendennis built.
1542 St. Mawes Castle built.
1542–44 Pendennis Castle built, temp. Henry VIII. Sir John Killigrew first Governor, which office he retained until 1567.
1544 Supposed date of Henry VIII's visit to the two castles.
1552 Date of Sir Walter Raleigh's visit.
1567 Arwenack manor house built by John Killigrew.
1600 Ale-house called "Penny-come-quick," near Greenbank quay, established by Mr. Pendarves' servant."
1600 Arwenack House, and a few fishermen's huts, all that were built (1550 has also been mentioned as the date, possibly of the erection of the house).
1613 Date of the rise of Falmouth; Sir John Killigrew's plan.
1613 Petitions of Truro, Penryn and Helston to James I against its progress.
1619 Sir John established a lighthouse at the Lizard.
1620 Visitation of the Heralds.
1642 Prince Charles (Charles II) at Pendennis Castle, protected by the Governor, John Arundel.
1644-5 Duke of Hamilton confined in Pendennis Castle.
1644 Queen Henrietta Maria at Pendennis Castle on her way to France.
1646 Pendennis Castle besieged by Cromwell's forces under Sir Thomas Fairfax, in March, and Arwenack House partly destroyed by fire. Surrendered in August 1646.

1650 The Custom-house removed from Penryn to Falmouth, near the Market Strand.
1652 Markets established by Sir Peter Killigrew.
1655 George Fox (the founder of the Quakers) visited Falmouth.
1660 The names of Smithike and Penny-come-quick changed to Falmouth by Charles II's proclamation, 20 August.
1660 William Killigrew created a baronet.
1660 A prison built.
1661 October 5. Charter of the Incorporation of Falmouth granted by Charles II.
1661 A quay authorised.
1662 Parish church built; opened 1663; consecrated 1664.
1662 An Independent Congregation formed by Thomas Tregosse.
1663 Register of baptisms at Falmouth Church commences.
1664 Registers of marriages and burials commence.
1664 Falmouth Parish separated from Budock and Gluvias by Act of Parliament.
1664 Falmouth Parish Church consecrated by Dr. Seth Ward, Bishop of Exeter.
1664 Two hundred houses in Falmouth.
1664 (or 61) Earldom of Falmouth created by Charles II.
1670 Society of Friends (Quakers) first established.
1670 Sir Peter Killigrew built a new quay near Arwenack.
1670 Baptist Society established.
1684 Chancel built at east end of Parish Church, by Walter Quarme, rector.
1686 Gallery built at west end of Parish Church by Sir Peter Killigrew and Mr. Bryan Rogers.
1688 Falmouth became a Packet station.
1696 Constitution of Falmouth drawn up and adopted.
1699 Gallery on north side of Parish Church, built by contributions.
Close of 17th century, 350 houses in Falmouth

Eighteenth century

1703 Gallery on south side of Parish church built, and also organ at west end.
1704 Sir Peter Killigrew (second) d. at Ludlow, Shropshire, 8 January. Interred in Falmouth Church.
1705 Five Packets sailed between Falmouth and the West Indies.
1709. The Mayor and Corporation of Falmouth established their claim against Truro to the jurisdiction of Falmouth harbour. (1703/4 also given)
1713–15 Independent Chapel erected in Prince Street.
1715 Congregational Chapel built; enlarged 1789.
1717 Pendennis Castle struck by lightning and seriously damaged.
1723 Independent Chapel in High Street.
1725 Town Hall in High Street given by Mr. M. L. Killigrew, a brick building, previously a chapel.
1737-8 Granite pyramid built by Mr. M. L. Killigrew, near Arwenack.
1740 Large church bell provided by Mr. M. L. Killigrew.
1745 John Wesley at Falmouth.
1748 Fairs at Falmouth; July and October.
1749 Alterations made at the Parish Church, probably to the tower, etc.
1750 Seamen's Hospital established.
1750 Church enlarged at West End.
1750 Between 500 and 600 houses in Falmouth.

1751 Freemasons Lodge (of Love and Honour) established (the "Mother Lodge" of the Province).
1753 New Independent Chapel built in High Street.
1754 Methodists first established in Falmouth by John Wesley.
1757 Benjamin Franklin landed at Falmouth on his way to America.
1766 First Jews' Synagogue, near Mount Sion.
1769 Baptist Chapel in Well Lane.
1779 Death of Joan Davis, aged 101.
1780 Mrs. Ann Davell's Charity of £9 per annum to poor widows or their sons.
1781 Falmouth Bank established; Joseph Banfield and Co., afterwards Came, Lake and Co.
1781 October 25. A fire, which caused distress to twenty-five families.
1785 New Custom House built near Arwenack.
1788 August 16. A great fire in Church Street, extending up Well Lane, and as far as the present Public Rooms.

1789 Grove Hill House begun.
1790 New Independent Chapel in High Street; Mr. Wildbore, minister.
1791 Methodist (or Wesleyan) Chapel in Killigrew Street, enlarged in 1814, organ in 1859; great thunderstorm; Trescobeas and ships in harbour struck.
1792 August 21. Great fire which destroyed forty-two houses and the theatre.
1792 Market-house re-built owing to insecurity of the old foundation.
1792 Sunday Schools founded from 1792 to 1810.
1793 Death of Catherine Freeman, aged 117.
1794 A brew-house built, disclosing a bed of beach sand under the ground.
1795 Crab Quay and Half Moon batteries built below the Castle.
1795 The Crown purchased the land on which the Castle stands (about sixty acres), from Sir John Wodehouse.
1797 Pendennis Volunteer Artillery commissioned.
1798 Organ placed in the gallery of the Parish Church.
1799 Baptist Chapel built.
1800 The Church tower raised for the clock.

Nineteenth century

1801–1810

1801 Falmouth population: 4,849. 1801–11: 719 houses.
1801 Illuminations on peace being proclaimed.
1801 Cornwall Gazette and Falmouth Packet started.
1802 Richard Pidgeley bequeathed £5 per annum for distribution of bread to the poor, from the estate of Mulberry Square, for 1,000 years.
1802 Church Charity School founded for girls, and in 1804 for boys.
1803-5 Friends' Meeting-house built in Quay Street.
1803 Roman Catholic Mission founded.
1804 Baptist Chapel built in Webber Street; enlarged in 1807 and re-built in 1814; and enlarged by a gallery, 1834.
1805 Methodist Sunday School.
1806 Cornish Naval Bank (afterwards Cornish Bank), opened in Church Street.
1806 Second Jews' Synagogue built on Forhan Hill.

1807 April 3. Public Dispensary opened.
1807 Misericordia Society founded by Lieut.-Governor Melvill.
1808 October 9. Expedition under Sir David Baird of 150 transports carrying between 12,000 and 13,000 men, convoyed by H.M.S. Louis, Amelia and Champion. On 13th entered Corunna Harbour.
1809 Celebration of fifty years reign of George III.
1809 Church Sunday School founded by the Rev. R. H. Hitchins and Captain Melvill.
1809 The harbour pilots regulated by the Trinity Board.
1809 Second Freemasons' Lodge founded, "Love and Unity." Other orders.
1809 National Schools on Wodehouse Terrace.
1810 Charitable Society founded.
1810 Widows' Retreat founded by Lord Wodehouse and Mr. Samuel Tregelles.
1810 Mutiny of the Packets-men.
1810 Baptist Sunday School.

1811–1820

1811 Howellian Girls' Free School; Boys' ditto; organised by Miss Howell.
1811 Bible society established.
1812 Lord Clinton, bearer of the news of the victory of Salamanca, on 21 July.
1812 Death of John Zouster, aged 105.
1812 Unitarian Society founded.
1812 Parish Church lengthened one-third at east end, at a cost of £1,643.
1812 250 sail sheltered from a storm in Falmouth Harbour, convoyed by several of H.M's. ships.
1812 Lancastrian Boys' School established.
1812 Accident at the Parish Church, causing loss of several lives, 29 November.
1812 Removal of the Market.
1813 Market-house built by Lord Wodehouse.
1813 British Girls' School founded at Smithick Hill.
1813 Humane Society founded.

1814 Proclamation of peace and rejoicings in Falmouth, 2 November. .
1814 The Queen transport wrecked at Trefusis Point on her way home from Lisbon to Plymouth, and 195 persons drowned.
1814 Adult School founded.
1814 Infant School founded.
1815 Between thirty and forty Packets sailing to and from Falmouth.
1815 Napoleon brought into Falmouth Harbour on board HMS Northumberland.
1817 Provident Institution for the relief of poor in winter founded.
1817 Falmouth Savings Bank founded.
1818 Unitarian Chapel built in the Moor.
1819 Cornish Naval Bank carried on by Messrs. Praed, Rogers, Tweedy, and Williams.
1819 First Gas-Works established by Mr. Wynne.
1820 Roman Catholic Chapel built on Green Bank (formerly in Well Lane).

1821–1830

1821 850 houses, and 7,000 population.
1824 Classical and Mathematical School built, Headmaster, Rev. T. Sheepshanks. Endowed 1892 by a bequest from Miss Curgenven, aunt of H. M. Jeffery, F.R.S.
1825 Loss of the E.I.C. ship Kent by fire in the Bay of Biscay, on 24 February: 547 persons rescued and brought in the Cambria to Falmouth.
1826 Public Reading and News Rooms built and opened in Church Street.
1826 Swanpool tunnel made.
1827 National School on Mount Sion opened, including Church Charity School, through the exertions of the Rev. L.Mathias and Mr. B. B. Falck, jun.
1827 Fire at Quay Street, and another at Tregedna.
1827 900 houses, and over 8,000 inhabitants.

1827 Visit of H.R.H. the Duke of Clarence, Lord High Admiral, in the Royal Sovereign yacht, and inspection of the Packets.
1827-8 Penwerris Church built.
1828 Donna Maria da Gloria, second Queen of Portugal, landed at Falmouth, 27 September.
1828-9 Losses of the Redpole, Hearty, Arid, and Myrtle Packets.
1828 Disaster at a Falmouth ball.
1829 Falmouth Packet and Cornish Herald started (discontinued in 1848).
1829 Wesleyan Chapel in Porhan Street built.
1830 Bible Christian Chapel built on Smithick Hill.

1831–1840

1831 The ex-Emperor and Empress of Brazil visited Falmouth (on board the Volage).
1832 United Borough of Penryn and Falmouth incorporated, returning two M.P.s. In 1885 Flushing added, and the representation reduced to one. St. Mawes disfranchised.
1832 Steam Packet to Lisbon twice a month.
1832 Primitive Methodist Chapel built in Chapel Terrace; enlarged by gallery in 1836.
1833 Royal Cornwall Polytechnic Society founded and Public Library.
1833 Cholera at Falmouth.
1834 Polytechnic Hall built.
1834 Act creating Unions passed; meetings of Guardians shortly after.
1834 St. Anthony's lighthouse begun.
1835 The cone and iron standard on the Black Rock built by the Trinity House.

1835 Municipal Corporation Act passed.
1835 Lieut.-Governorship of Pendennis Castle abolished.
1836 Meridian Stone placed in field near Beacon.
1836 The Killigrew obelisk removed to the top of the old ropewalk.
1837 The office of Governor of Pendennis Castle abolished.
1837 Some forty Packets sailing to and from Falmouth.

1838 Rev. William J. Coope, Rector of Falmouth.
1840 Gyllyngdune House built by the Coope family.

1841–1850

1842 Governorship of St. Mawes Castle abolished.
1843 Queen Victoria and Prince Albert visited Falmouth, 1 September, Mr. Joseph Fox, Mayor.
1845 Oddfellows' Lodge opened.
1845 Destructive fire at the Market Strand in January.
1846 Second visit of Queen Victoria and the Prince Consort on 14 September, in steam yacht Victoria and Albert. Mr. R. R. Broad, Mayor.

1846 County Court founded: held in Old Town Hall (now Oddfellows' Hall).
1847-8 Falmouth Water-works established.
1848 Western Provident Association founded.
1848 Atheneum Library and Museum founded.
1848 Penwerris made a District Church.
1849 British and Foreign Sailors' Society founded-Seamen's Bethel and Institute.
1849 Vestry added on north side of Parish Church.
1850 Falmouth ceased to be a Packet Station.

1851–1860

1851 H.M.S. Astrea left Falmouth Harbour.
1851 Union Workhouse founded.
1852 Royal Cornwall Sailors' Home founded.
1852 Art Union formed in connection with the Roryal Cornwall Polytechnic Society.
1852 Swanpool Mine first worked, 16 March.
1853 Congregational Chapel built in High Street.
1853 July 23. 149 vessels for orders in Falmouth under 21 different flags.
1853 Town Mission established.

1855 Young Men's Christian Association.
1855 Lake's Falmouth Packet started.
1857 Falmouth Cemetery laid out; consecrated (church ground) in 1857.
1857 Electric Telegraph Company opened a station in Arwenack Street.
1858 H.M.S. Russell, training-ship, at Falmouth.
1859 Cornwall Railway opened to Truro.
1860 The Docks begun.
1860 Mail S.S. Hungarian lost with all hands, including G. P. Nash, of Falmouth, mail master.
1860 Greenwich Time generally adopted at Falmouth.
1860 Falmouth Archery Club.

1861–1870

1861 Parish Church provided with three bells.
1861 Repairs at Parish Church, Sir Peter Killigrew's vault seen, 24 April.
1861 Foresters' Court opened.
1861 The Duke and Duchess de Montpensier arrived in a Spanish Man-of-War, 5 July.
1861 Missions to Seamen commenced.
1861 Maria Camilla Training School for girls founded.
1862 Testimonial to Mr. T. H. Tilly, for his work in behalf of the Docks.
1862 Penny Savings Bank opened.
1862 Falmouth Debating Society.
1862 H.R.H. Prince Arthur visited Falmouth.
1862 April 12. Great fire in High Street, destroying thirty houses. A smaller fire same year in Church Street.
1863 Falmouth adopted the Local Government Act.
1863 Gyllyngdune sold by Rev. W. J. Coope to Mr. Sampson Waters for £10,000.
1863 Old Rectory premises sold for £720.
1863 August 21.
1863 Catholic and Apostolic (Irvingite) Church closed.
1864 New Town Hall begun.
1864 April 7. General Garibaldi in Duke of Sutherland's yacht, at Falmouth.
1864 May 10. H.M.S. St. George (training) at Falmouth.

1865 Falmouth Hotel opened.
1865 Drive made round Pendennis Castle.
1865 July 10. H.R.H. the Duke of Cornwall and Grand Duke Alexis visited Falmouth, 1866.
1865 March. Hoard of 960 Roman Brass Coins, A.D. 306, found at Pennance Head.
1865 Fire at Masonic Lodge, destroying valuable paintings, etc.
1866 February 10. Church of Saint Laud, Mabe injured by lightning.
1866 Working Men's Club and Institute at Bell's Court opened.
1866 Wesleyan Chapel built at Pike's Hill.
1866 Chamber of Commerce founded.
1866 New Gas Works opened.
1867 Falmouth Observatory established by the Royal Cornwall Polytechnic Society; (first Meteorological) maintained by grant from the Meteorological Council.
1867 Life-boat established; launched 29 August.
1867 Bible Christian Chapel built.

1867 Wesleyan Chapel built at Pike's Hill.
1867 Three wrecks at Gyllyngvase, and damage to shipping.
1867 Royal Cornwall Home for Destitute Girls built.
1868 March 14. Bank House burnt down.
1868 June 1. Exhibition of Bath and West of England Agricultural Society.
1868 St. Mawes Steamboats established.
1869 Roman Catholic Church built in Killigrew Street.
1869 Earle's Retreat built for aged persons, by Mr. George Earle, of Philadelphia, D.S.A., and Falmouth.
1870 June 5. Great Fire at Market Street.
1870 Harbour Board.

1871–1880

1871 New landing places at Fish Strand and Market Strand built. At the latter a sub-marine forest discovered. Foundation stones laid by Lord Kimberley.
1871 Penwerris Day Schools opened.
1871 The Killigrew Obelisk removed to green in front of Arwenack.
1872 Royal Cornwall Yacht Club opened (1874 also given).

1873 Direct Spanish Telegraph established.
1873 Friends' New Meeting-house built.
1873 H.M.S. Russell removed.
1873 Volunteer Drill hall built.

1874 May 13. H.M.S. Ganges arrived.
1874 Wesleyan Chapel rebuilt in the Moor.

1875 Baptist Chapel built in Market Street.
1875 School Board formed.
1876 Mission Church or Chapel-of-Ease established in Lower Killigrew Street.
1877 Kimberley Park presented by the Earl of Kimberley
1877-8 Trevethan Girls' and Infants' Board Schools built.
1878 August 14. Portrait of Mr. R. R. Broad, Senr., presented by Lord Northbrook at banquet at the Royal Hotel.

1881–1890

1881 Congregational Sunday School erected in Prince Street.
1881 Climatological Station established at Observatory.
1882 Young Women's Christian Association founded.
1882 Girls' British School (Clare Terrace) opened in May.
1882 Jubilee Exhibition of the Polytechnic Society.
1882 The Rev. Brian Christopherson became Rector.
1883 Cottage Hospital and Nursing Home founded by Mrs. FitzGerald.
1883 Church Institute founded.
1883 Cornwall Volunteer Artillery established.

1884 August 12. Foundation stone of second Meteorological Observatory laid by Earl of Mount Edgcumbe.
1885 New Masonic Hall built, opened in 1886.
1885 Falmouth lost one Member of Parliament by the Redistribution of Seats Act.
1886 Self-recording magnetographs placed in new Observatory.
1887 High School for Girls built.
1887 Recreation Ground opened.
1887 Jubilee of Queen Victoria's reign celebrated.
1887 Visit of H.R.H. the Prince of Wales, who laid the foundation stone of All Saints' Church.
1888 Good Templars' Lodge founded.
1889 Consecration of All Saints' Church.
1890 All Saints' Church opened.

1891–1900

1891 March 9 and l0th. Great Snow Blizzard. Trains snowed up in Cornwall.
1891 Census, 2,400 houses, and over 10,000 inhabitants (excluding ships).
1891 Association for befriending Young Servants founded.
1892 Order of Rechabites founded.
1892 Maria Camilla School closed.
1892 May 20. Broad gauge altered to narrow on G.W.R., from Exeter, in 50 hours.
1892 Extension and consolidation of the Borough.
1892 Bequest of nearly £2,000 from Mr. Octavius Ferris for a Free Library.
1893 Mission Church in Killigrew Street repaired and opened.
1893 May 3. Foundation stone of Falmouth Hospital laid by Mr. Passmore Edwards.
1893 July. Pendennis Hotel opened.
1893 The Mayor's gold chain purchased for £125.
1894 Municipal Building and Free Library built by Passmore Edwards.

1894 Falmouth Sailing Club founded.
1894 R.C. Agricultural Show held at Falmouth.
1894 Art Gallery built.
1894 Golf Club and Links at Higher Argal; removed to Higher Kergillick in 1898.
1895 Buffaloes Lodge founded.

1896 Presentation of his portrait and some plate to Mr. Thos. Webber, "eight times Mayor of Falmouth."
1896 March 9, Science and Art Rooms opened in Municipal Buildings.
1897 Board School for boys built at Wellington Terrace.

1897 Smithick (Infants') Board School purchased from Trustees of British School.
1897 January 16, the Falmouth Rector's rate abolished as such by special Act of Parliament.
1897 Diamond Jubilee (60 years) of the reign of Queen Victoria celebrated. Bonfires on all heights.
1897 Time-ball fixed at Pendennis Castle.
1898 Restoration of Parish Church completed. The tower struck by lightning without damage.
1898 March 26. Fire at Ellerslie, Melville Road.
1898 Packet Memorial erected in the Moor, and unveiled Moor.

1898 Wreck of the SS Mohegan on The Manacles.
, and loss of 106 lives.
1899 H.M.S. Ganges left Falmouth, 28 August.
1899 Stranding of the SS Paris near the Manacles.
1899 May 26. Devon and Cornwall Regiment, marching through Cornwall, received at Falmouth.
1899 Gallery, etc., added to Drill Hall.
1899 October 6. First Conversazione of Polytechnic Society held (alternately with Exhibition).
1900 Rifle Club formed.

Twentieth century

1901 January 26. King Edward VII proclaimed.
1901 August 19. Art School commenced in Manor Avenue, in memoriam Anna Maria Fox; stone laid by Lord St. Levan.
1901 Church House in memoriam E. D. ALDERTON opened in Arwenack Street.

1901 New Police Station built in the Moor.
1901 Census taken; Falmouth population, 11,173.
1901 Old King's Arms Inn pulled down at Market Strand.

Sources

Gay, Susan E., Old Falmouth, The Story of the town from the days of the Killigrews to the earliest part of the 19th Century

References

1903 documents
Falmouth, Cornwall
History of Cornwall
Cornwall-related lists
falmouth